WYAL (1280 AM) is a radio station broadcasting a religious format. Licensed to Scotland Neck, North Carolina, United States, the station is owned by Sky City Communications Inc.

External links

YAL
YAL